Cardinal Mountain is a 13,396-foot-elevation (4,083 meter) mountain summit located on the crest of the Sierra Nevada mountain range in northern California. It is situated on the common border of Fresno County with Inyo County, as well as the shared boundary of John Muir Wilderness and Kings Canyon National Park. Cardinal Mountain ranks as the 73rd highest summit in California. The first ascent of the summit was made August 11, 1922, by George Downing, Jr. The standard approach is via the Taboose Pass Trail, and the John Muir Trail passes west of this peak, providing an approach option to the mountain. The mountain's descriptive name was given by George R. Davis, a USGS topographer, on account of the brilliant red color of the roof pendant, like the red cap of a cardinal.

Climate
According to the Köppen climate classification system, Cardinal Mountain has an alpine climate. Most weather fronts originate in the Pacific Ocean, and travel east toward the Sierra Nevada mountains. As fronts approach, they are forced upward by the peaks, causing them to drop their moisture in the form of rain or snowfall onto the range (orographic lift). Precipitation runoff from this mountain drains west into the South Fork Kings River, and east to the Owens Valley via Red Mountain and Taboose Creeks.

See also

 List of mountain peaks of California

Gallery

References

External links
 Weather forecast: Cardinal Mountain
 Geology of the Split Mountain/Cardinal Mountain area: Geoscienceworld.org
 Cardinal (left) and Split Mountains, aerial photo from east: Flickr

Mountains of Fresno County, California
Mountains of Kings Canyon National Park
Inyo National Forest
Mountains of Inyo County, California
Mountains of the John Muir Wilderness
North American 4000 m summits
Mountains of Northern California
Sierra Nevada (United States)